Lépicier is a French surname. Notable people with the surname include:

Alexis Lépicier (1863–1936), French cardinal
Maël Lépicier (born 1986), French-Congolese footballer

French-language surnames